The Federal University of Lavras (UFLA) is a Brazilian university with headquarters in Lavras, Minas Gerais.

The university was founded as an agricultural school by Dr. Samuel Rhea Gammon in 1908.  Total enrollment is over 16,000 students in undergraduate, graduate, and distance-learning programs.

References

External links

 

Universities and colleges in Minas Gerais
Educational institutions established in 1909
1909 establishments in Brazil
Lavras